Zoltán Kiss may refer to:

 Zoltán Kiss (musician), born 1980, member of Mnozil Brass since 2005
 Zoltán Kiss (footballer, born 1980), Hungarian footballer
 Zoltán Kiss (footballer, born 1986), Hungarian footballer